McGraw Brook is a settlement in New Brunswick.  McGraw Brook is the location of McGraw Brook Provincial Park.

History

Notable people

See also
List of communities in New Brunswick

References

Settlements in New Brunswick
Communities in Northumberland County, New Brunswick